This is a list of American football players who have played for the Evansville Crimson Giants in the National Football League (NFL). It includes players that have played at least one match in the NFL .  The Evansville Crimson Giants franchise was founded in 1921 and lasted until 1922.

B
Bourbon Bondurant,

D
Slats Dalrymple, 
Winnie Denton

E
Vic Endress

F
Frank Fausch,
Alec Fishman,
Louie Fritsch

G
Bill Garnjost, 
Earl Goldsmith, 
Doc Gorman

H
Herb Henderson

I
Mark Ingle

J
Red Jackson

L
Tiny Ladson, 
Pete Lauer,
Vince Lensing,
Menz Lindsey,
John McDonald, 
Chief Mullen

M
John McDonald

N
Chuck O'Neil

R
Jess Reno, 
Spencer Rork,
Tubby Rohsenberger

S
Joe Sanders, 
Frank J. Skinner,
Lew Skinner, 
Bill Slyker, 
Dick Spain, 
Clarence Spiegel,
Steve Sullivan

W
Earl Warweg,
Pete Wathen,
Walker Whitehead,
Travis Williams,
Joe Windbiel, 
Leon Winterheimer

Z
Jerry Zeller

References
1921 Evansille Crimson Giants roster
1922 Evansille Crimson Giants roster

 
E